George Henry Horler (10 February 1895 – March 1967) was an English professional footballer who played as a full back in the Football League for Reading, West Ham United and Fulham.

Personal life 
Horler served as a sergeant in the Army Medical Corps during the First World War.

Career statistics

References 

1895 births
1967 deaths
English footballers
Reading F.C. players
English Football League players
British Army personnel of World War I
Association football fullbacks
Footballers from Somerset
Frome Town F.C. players
West Ham United F.C. players
Fulham F.C. players
Aldershot F.C. players
Royal Army Medical Corps soldiers

Southern Football League players